Henry Jones Farmstead is a historic home and farm located near Sedalia, Pettis County, Missouri.  The farmhouse was built in 1878, and is a two-story, Italianate style brick dwelling.  It has a Georgian plan, a portico with balustraded deck, and low hipped roof topped by a widow's walk. Attached is a summer kitchen that was constructed in 1885.  Also on the property are the contributing frame gable roof tenant cottage (c. 1892), a buggy house (c. 1890), and a transverse crib barn (1892).

It was listed on the National Register of Historic Places in 2008.

References

Farms on the National Register of Historic Places in Missouri
Georgian architecture in Missouri
Italianate architecture in Missouri
Houses completed in 1878
Buildings and structures in Pettis County, Missouri
National Register of Historic Places in Pettis County, Missouri